This is a list of the members of the Dewan Negara (Senate) of the Fifth Parliament of Malaysia.

Elected by the State Legislative Assembly

Nominated by the Prime Minister and appointed by the Yang di-Pertuan Agong

Death in office
 Abu Bakar Titingan Damsani (d. 20 January 1980)
 Dasimah Dasir (d. 7 October 1980)
 Ismail Sheikh Ibrahim (d. 17 June 1981)

Footnotes

References

Malaysian parliaments
Lists of members of the Dewan Negara